Cross Lake Provincial Park  is a provincial park in Alberta, Canada, located  west from Athabasca and  north of Westlock.

The park was established on November 22, 1955, and is maintained by Alberta Tourism, Parks and Recreation. It completely surrounds Steele Lake, which has a cruciform shape that led to the previous name of "Cross Lake", the source of the park's name.

Activities
The following activities are available in the park:
Birdwatching (white-throated sparrows, ruffed grouse, warbler, osprey, bald eagles, great blue herons, bohemian waxwings, pine grosbeaks and white-winged crossbills)
Camping
Canoeing and kayaking
Cross-country skiing ( of non-groomed trails)
Fishing and ice fishing
Hiking
Horseshoes
Power boating
Swimming, water-skiing and windsurfing

Climate

See also
List of Alberta provincial parks
List of Canadian provincial parks
List of National Parks of Canada

References

External links

Municipal District of Lesser Slave River No. 124
Provincial parks of Alberta